Once a Hero is an American action-adventure television series that aired on ABC from September 19 until October 3, 1987. The series stars Milo O'Shea as Abner Bevis, a down-on-his-luck comic book artist whose life is turned upside down when his creation, Captain Justice (Jeff Lester), comes to life. Also appearing in the series were Caitlin Clarke and Robert Forster.

Premise
Abner Bevis (Milo O'Shea) is the creator of a comic-book superhero called Captain Justice. Lately Bevis is in a rut and repeating old storylines, and children have lost interest in the comic, so the comic's owners want to kill off the title. Even the characters in the book's fictional world of Pleasantville have started to notice that their lives are repeating themselves, and the lack of reader interest is causing characters to start fading.

Captain Justice (Jeff Lester) decides to cross the Forbidden Zone into the real world, where he becomes a real human being with no superpowers. Also crossing over is Gumshoe (Robert Forster), the embodiment of generic private detectives, who's looking out for Justice. The Captain's attempts to fight real-world criminals renew interest in the comic, and the owners agree not to cancel it; also, Bevis is inspired to make it more contemporary.

Adding to the stories is suspicious newspaper reporter Emma Greely (Caitlin Clarke), who keeps snooping around. Her troubled and precocious son Woody (Josh Blake) knows the truth about Captain Justice, but she doesn't.

Cast
 Milo O'Shea as Abner Bevis
 Jeff Lester as Captain Justice/Brad Steele
 Robert Forster as Gumshoe
 Caitlin Clarke as Emma Greely
 Josh Blake as Woody Greely
 David Wohl as Edward "Eddie" Kybo

Production

Jim Turner was initially cast as Captain Justice, he "was cast against type, a small, skinny guy ... It was supposed to be a joke", but when the producers became worried he might not be suitable as the lead, the role was recast with Jeff Lester.

A pilot with Turner had been shot, and writer Ira Steven Behr suggested that key advertising-agency executives had seen the abandoned version of the pilot, which caused bad word-of-mouth for the show, ultimately dooming it.

Episodes
Seven episodes were created, but only the first three of them were aired in the United States.

Reception
Many ABC stations preempted the show's first episode with Star Trek: The Next Generation, which they correctly decided would be more successful after watching the ABC show; one station stated that "Once a Hero is gone". Although widely promoted, the series was a ratings failure, and was cancelled after three episodes were broadcast.

In other media

Comics
Marvel Comics began publishing a comic book spin-off, Captain Justice, but this too was short-lived and was cancelled after two issues.

References

External links
 
 The show's opening at YouTube
 Once a Hero at SFF.net

1987 American television series debuts
1987 American television series endings
1980s American comic science fiction television series
1980s American sitcoms
American Broadcasting Company original programming
American superhero comedy television series
English-language television shows
Television series by New World Television
Television shows about comics